Cedar Crest is an unincorporated community in Fresno County, California.

A post office operated at Cedar Crest from 1923 to 1955, and from 1962 to the present.

References

Unincorporated communities in California
Unincorporated communities in Fresno County, California
Populated places established in 1923